Buha is a surname. Notable people with this surname include:

 Aleksa Buha (born 1939), Serbian philosopher
 Aljoša Buha (1962–1988), Bosnian musician
 Boško Buha (1926–1943), Yugoslav Partisan
 Jason Buha (born 1975), American golfer

See also
 

Serbian surnames